Binmagta بنماقطة is a Tunisian village located 6 to 8 km between Thala and Haidra.

Villages in Tunisia
Populated places in Kasserine Governorate